Staley and Millbrook railway station served the villages Staley and Millbrook in Stalybridge, Cheshire (later Tameside).

The station was built by the London and North Western Railway on the Micklehurst Line and opened on 3 May 1886. It served passengers until closure on 1 November 1909. The line through the station remained open for passenger traffic until 7 September 1964 and for freight until 1972.

References
Notes

Bibliography

Disused railway stations in Tameside
Former London and North Western Railway stations
Railway stations in Great Britain opened in 1886
Railway stations in Great Britain closed in 1909